The Marmora Lakers were a Senior "AAA" ice hockey team in the Ontario Hockey Association's Eastern Ontario Senior Hockey League from 2003 to 2008, based in Marmora, Ontario, Canada.  The team was coached by Shawn Antoski and managed by Curtis Trimble.

History
The Macs were based out of Belleville, Ontario, playing home games at the Yardmen Arena.  They moved to Marmora in 2006 to better accommodate the EOSHL who were down to only four teams.

The Macs originally use the name of an earlier senior hockey team, the Belleville McFarlands, during the first seasons of play.

After two seasons in Marmora, the EOSHL merged with Major League Hockey to create the Major Hockey League.  The small town Lakers chose not to pursue the high travel new league.

Season-by-season standings

External links
Mamora Lakers archived site (May 8, 2008)

Eastern Ontario Senior Hockey League teams